"Scotch & Chocolate" is an instrumental song played by the modern bluegrass band Nickel Creek. It was the fourth song on Nickel Creek's album, Why Should the Fire Die?. In 2006, Scotch & Chocolate was nominated for a Grammy Award for Best Country Instrumental Performance.

Personnel
Chris Thile - Mandolin
Sean Watkins - Guitar
Sara Watkins - Fiddle
Mark Schatz - Bass

External links
 Official Nickel Creek website
 Nickel Creek Store

2005 songs
Nickel Creek songs
Song recordings produced by Eric Valentine
Instrumentals
Songs written by Chris Thile
Songs written by Sara Watkins